Yang Pan-hou or Yang Banhou (1837–1890) was an influential teacher of t'ai chi ch'uan (taijiquan) in Ch'ing dynasty China, known for his bellicose temperament.

Biography
He was the senior son of Yang Luchan to survive to adulthood. Like his father, he was retained as a martial arts instructor by the Chinese Imperial family. He eventually became the formal teacher of Wu Ch'uan-yu (Wu Quanyou), a Manchu Banner cavalry officer of the Palace Battalion. Wu Ch'uan-yu's son, Wu Chien-ch'uan (Wu Jianquan), also a Banner officer, became known as the co-founder (along with his father) of the Wu-style t'ai chi ch'uan. Yang Pan-hou's younger brother Yang Chien-hou was a well known teacher of Yang-style t'ai chi ch'uan as well. Yang Pan-hou's son, Yang Shao-p'eng (1875-1938) was also a t'ai chi teacher.

Yang Banhou taught Wang Jiao-Yu his father's Guang Ping Yang t'ai chi ch'uan form, Wang Jiao-Yu taught Kuo Lien Ying this original Yang style form.

T'ai chi ch'uan lineage tree with Yang-style focus

References

External links
Video: 

1837 births
1890 deaths
Chinese tai chi practitioners
Sportspeople from Handan